Aspidistra nikolaii  is a plant species of the genus Aspidistra that was one of the new 21 species of plants and animals recently discovered in the Annamite Range of central Vietnam. It was named after a late Russian botanist named Nicolai Arnautov. It has a dark blue flower that is almost black.

References

External links
National Geographic
Times Online

nikolaii
Endemic flora of Vietnam